Eugenio Staccione (14 April 1909 – 5 May 1967) was an Italian professional footballer who played as a goalkeeper.

Early and personal life
Staccione was born in Turin; his older brother, Vittorio was also a professional footballer.

Career
Staccione played for Torino, Casale, Messina, Juventus and Valle d'Aosta.

Later life and death
After retiring from football, Staccione worked as a labourer for FIAT.

1909 births
1967 deaths
Italian footballers
Association football goalkeepers
Footballers from Turin
Torino F.C. players
Casale F.B.C. players
A.C.R. Messina players
Juventus F.C. players